Expedition of Ghalib ibn Abdullah al-Laithi to Mayfah took place in January 628 AD, 9th Month 7AH, of the Islamic Calendar.

Expedition
Muhammad sent Ghalib ibn Abdullah al-Laithi as the commander of 130 men to Mayfah on the confines of Nejd, and was sent to launch an attack against Banu ‘Awâl and Banu Thalabah in Ramadan 7 A.H. The settlement was surprised and the Muslims put many to death, and drove off their camels and flock .

Usama, one of the fighters who went along, killed a man, after he had pronounced the testimony of God's Oneness at the last moment just before killing him (see Shahadah) to which incident Muhammad commented addressing his Companions: "Would you rip open his heart to discern whether he is truthful or a liar?"

This was the 4th surprise raid against the Banu Thalabah.

Primary source
This event is mentioned in the following primary sources:

Ibn Sa'd, Kitab al-tabaqat al-kabir, Volume 2
Tabari, Volume 8, History of Islam

See also
Military career of Muhammad
List of expeditions of Muhammad

Notes

629
Campaigns ordered by Muhammad